The 2008 Auburn Tigers football team represented Auburn University during 2008 NCAA Division I FBS football season. Tommy Tuberville served his tenth and final season as head coach at Auburn. He was joined by a new defensive coordinator Paul Rhoads and new offensive coordinator Tony Franklin, who attempted to implement Tuberville’s new without the proper players suited for the spread offense in a failed effort to correct the Tigers' offensive struggles in 2007. Tuberville fired Franklin six games into the season.

Auburn played a seven-game home schedule at Jordan–Hare Stadium, while traveling to Mountaineer Field in Morgantown, West Virginia for the Tigers' first ever meeting with the West Virginia Mountaineers. The Tennessee Volunteers returned to the Tigers' schedule for the first time since Auburn defeated Tennessee twice in AU's undefeated 2004 season. LSU, Arkansas, and Georgia rounded out Auburn's home conference schedule.

Pre-season

Rankings
The Tigers entered the season with high expectations, ranked highly by multiple polls in the preseason. The Associated Press Poll placed Auburn at #10 while the USA Today Coaches' Poll, a component of the Bowl Championship Series rankings, had Auburn at #11. Other rankings include:

# 7 – Rivals.com# 8 – Athlon# 9 – Sports Illustrated# 9 – CollegeTop25 Consensus# 10 – ESPN# 13 – Lindy's# 14 – CollegeFootballNews/Scout.com

Watchlists and honors
Walter Camp Award watchlist – Sen'Derrick Marks(DT)
Bronko Nagurski Trophy watchlist – Antonio Coleman(DE) and Sen'Derrick Marks
Outland Trophy watchlist – Sen'Derrick Marks
Dave Rimington Trophy watchlist – Jason Bosley(C)
Playboy All-American – Sen'Derrick Marks

Pre-season All-SEC Teams
Coaches All-SEC 1st Team – DT Sen’Derrick Marks & P Ryan ShoemakerCoaches All-SEC 2nd Team – RB Ben Tate, OL Tyronne Green, LB Tray Blackmon & DB Jerraud PowersCoaches All-SEC 3rd Team – DE Antonio Coleman

Schedule
Auburn's schedule consisted of eight Southeastern Conference opponents (four home, four away) and four non-conference opponents. AU meets Tennessee-Martin and West Virginia for the first time. The WVU game, a mid-season inter-conference Thursday night matchup, is the first of a two-game home-and-home series between the two teams.  Of the remaining ten opponents that the Tigers have previously faced, Auburn holds the all-time series lead against all but Alabama and LSU.  Four opponents — #1 Georgia, LSU, West Virginia and Tennessee — were ranked in both the preseason USA Today and AP Polls. Alabama was also ranked in the AP Poll. Tennessee dropped out of the polls before playing Auburn; however, Vanderbilt would enter the polls by the time the Commodores played Auburn.

Game summaries

Louisiana-Monroe

Auburn's first possession only picked up 1 first down, but the punt put UL-Monroe in bad field position. On the first play, Auburn Defensive End Antonio Coleman made a huge hit on UL-Monroe's quarterback, forcing a fumble on the UL-Monroe 9-yard line, and the Defense picked it up and took it back for the Auburn Tigers' first touchdown. A few possessions later, Auburn Receiver and Punt Returner Robert Dunn returned a UL-Monroe punt for a TD with 0:04 left in the 1st Quarter. At halftime, Auburn had a 17–0 lead after a Wes Byrum field goal. On the opening kickoff of the 3rd quarter, UL-Monroe fumbled the ball and Auburn recovered, leading to a TD run from Brad Lester. Another field goal from Byrum would make the score 27–0 going into the 4th Quarter. Kodi Burns had left the game with a cut in his leg, so Chris Todd played the rest of the game. Later in the 4th, Todd would lead Auburn down the field with an excellent and suddenly effective passing game, ending in a 3-yard Touchdown pass to Chris Slaughter to seal the victory. It was the first shutout for Auburn since a 27–0 wins over Arkansas State on November 4, 2006. It was also the first time Auburn had scored on Offense, Defense, and Special Teams since the 2003 73–7 beating of UL-Monroe. Auburn finished with 406 yards of offense, 321 Rushing yards and 85 passing yards. Auburn picked up 19 first downs while UL-Monroe picked up 12.

Southern Miss
Southern Miss returned to the Plains for the first time since the 1993 perfect season. Prior to that meeting, the Tigers had lost consecutive 1-point losses to Southern Miss, then quarterbacked by Brett Favre.

Despite impressive offensive numbers in their opening game where Southern Mississippi put up 633 yards (427 rushing) in a 51–21 win over Louisiana-Lafayette, Larry Fedora's team did not have an answer for Auburn's tough defense. The Tigers won 27–13, improving their lead in the series all-time to 17–5.

Mississippi State

LSU

Tennessee

Vanderbilt

Arkansas

West Virginia

Ole Miss

Tennessee-Martin

Georgia

Alabama

Coaching staff

*Entering season

Depth chart
Starters and backups.

Rankings

Statistics

Team

Scores by quarter

Offense

Rushing

Passing

Receiving

Defense

Special teams

References

Auburn
Auburn Tigers football seasons
Auburn Tigers football